Ajax is an American, New York-based band, led by female singer Arleen Mitchel. The outfit released the single "Mind the Gap" in 1989, on Wax Trax! Records. A full-length self-titled debut LP followed, which combined industrial and acid-house music. The album, and its two singles failed to chart.

Mitchel revived the name in the 1990s, most successfully on the 1995 single "Ex-Junkie" which became a minor club hit. "Ex-Junkie" is the band's first (and to date last) entry on the Billboard Hot Dance/Club chart, peaking at number 48.

Discography

Albums

Singles

 Chart information courtesy of Billboard.com and AllMusic

References

External links
Ajax on AllMusic
Ajax on Discogs

Electronic music groups from New York (state)
Wax Trax! Records artists